Connor Hughes may refer to:

 Connor Hughes (American football) (born 1983), American football placekicker
 Connor Hughes (footballer) (born 1993), English football player